Bayerische Flugzeugwerke may refer to:

Otto Flugmaschinenfabrik, which became Bayerische Flugzeugwerke in 1916 and then Bayerische Motoren Werke in 1922
Messerschmitt, which was formed as Bayerische Flugzeugwerke in the 1920s before changing its name to Messerschmitt in 1938